Terry Robert Nealey (born January 30, 1947) is an American politician of the Republican Party. He is a former member of the Washington House of Representatives, representing the 16th district from 2009 to 2019. He was initially elected in a special election in November 2009.

In March 2018, Nealey announced he would not seek re-election in 2018 and would retire from the legislature.

Awards 
 2014 Guardians of Small Business award. Presented by NFIB.

Personal life 
Nealey's wife is Janice Nealey. They have two children. Nealey and his family live in Dayton, Washington.

References

1947 births
Living people
Republican Party members of the Washington House of Representatives
21st-century American politicians